The 2020 CAF Super Cup (officially the Total CAF Super Cup 2020 for sponsorship reasons) was the 29th CAF Super Cup, an annual football match in Africa organized by the Confederation of African Football (CAF), between the winners of the previous season's two CAF club competitions, the CAF Champions League and the CAF Confederation Cup.

The match was played between Al Ahly from Egypt, the 2019–20 CAF Champions League winners, and RS Berkane from Morocco, the 2019–20 CAF Confederation Cup winners, at the Jassim bin Hamad Stadium in Doha, Qatar on 28 May 2021.

The match was originally scheduled to be played on 14, 15 or 16 August 2020, in Qatar for the third season in a row, after they signed a three-year agreement with the CAF two seasons ago. However, the match was delayed due to the postponement of the 2019–20 CAF Champions League and CAF Confederation Cup as a result of the COVID-19 pandemic. On 20 November 2020, the CAF announced that the match would instead be played in Cairo, Egypt, with the date later set to be 10 December 2020. However, RS Berkane refused to play the match at the home country of Al Ahly, and insisted the match be played at a neutral country. The CAF announced on 10 December 2020 that the match would be moved back to Qatar, and to be played in the first half of 2021. It was reported that the match would be played on 17 February 2021, but it was later revealed that a date has not yet been set. The match was later once again rescheduled to be played on 28 May 2021.

Al Ahly won the match 2–0, winning their seventh CAF Super Cup title.

Teams

Venue
 
The match was played at Jassim bin Hamad Stadium in Doha, Qatar. The stadium has a capacity of 12,946 and is the home venue of Qatar Stars League side Al Sadd.

It was one of the five venues that hosted the 2011 AFC Asian Cup in the country, and hosted other notable matches before, including the 2014 and 2016 editions of the Supercoppa Italiana. The stadium was also one of the two venues that hosted the 2019 FIFA Club World Cup, hosting all first and second round fixtures.

Due to the COVID-19 pandemic in Qatar, attendance was limited to only 30% of the stadium's seating capacity. Fans who have received two doses of a COVID-19 vaccine only were allowed to enter the stadium.

Format
The CAF Super Cup is played as a single match at a neutral venue, with the CAF Champions League winners designated as the "home" team for administrative purposes. If the score is tied at the end of regulation, extra time will not be played, and the penalty shoot-out will be used to determine the winner (CAF Champions League Regulations XXVII and CAF Confederation Cup Regulations XXV).

Background
The match was the third CAF Super Cup to feature an Egyptian and a Moroccan team, with both previous matches ending in favor of the Egyptian side. Al Ahly qualified to the match after defeating fellow Egyptian rivals Zamalek 2–1 in the 2020 CAF Champions League Final. RS Berkane earned a place in the match after defeating 
Egyptian side Pyramids 1–0 in the 2020 CAF Confederation Cup Final.

This was the first ever meeting between both teams in all competitions.

Match

Statistics

See also
2020 CAF Champions League Final
2020 CAF Confederation Cup Final

Notes

References

External links
CAFonline.com

2020-21
Super Cup
International club association football competitions hosted by Qatar
May 2021 sports events in Asia
Al Ahly SC matches
RS Berkane matches